Mohammed Zakir Asdullah (born 28 August 1980) is an Indian weightlifter. He won the silver medal in the Men's 77 kg category at the 2006 Commonwealth Games.

References

Indian male weightlifters
Living people
1980 births
Commonwealth Games silver medallists for India
Weightlifters at the 2006 Commonwealth Games
Commonwealth Games medallists in weightlifting
Place of birth missing (living people)
20th-century Indian people
21st-century Indian people
Medallists at the 2006 Commonwealth Games